Chișcăreni is a commune in Sîngerei District, Moldova. It is composed of three villages: Chișcăreni, Nicolaevca and Slobozia-Chișcăreni.

References

Communes of Sîngerei District
Beletsky Uyezd